Sarika is a large genus of air-breathing land snails, terrestrial pulmonate gastropod mollusks in the subfamily Macrochlamydinae of the family Ariophantidae.

Species
 
 Sarika benoiti (Crosse & P. Fischer, 1863)
 Sarika birmana (L. Pfeiffer, 1857)
 Sarika bocourti (Morelet, 1875)
 Sarika caligina Pholyotha & Panha, 2020
 Sarika concavata Pholyotha, Sutcharit, Tongkerd, Lin & Panha, 2020
 Sarika consepta (Benson, 1860)
 Sarika costabilis A. Pholyotha, 2022
 Sarika costata A. Pholyotha, 2022
 Sarika despecta (Mabille, 1887)
 Sarika dohrniana (L. Pfeiffer, 1860)
 Sarika dugasti (Morlet, 1891)
 Sarika gratesi Pholyotha & Panha, 2020
 Sarika hainesi (L. Pfeiffer, 1856)
 Sarika heptagyra (Möllendorff, 1902)
 Sarika inferospira Pholyotha & Panha, 2020
 Sarika kawtaoensis Tomlin, 1929
 Sarika khmeriana Pholyotha & Panha, 2020
 Sarika lactoconcha Pholyotha & Panha, 2020
 Sarika lactospira Pholyotha & Panha, 2020
 Sarika limbata (Möllendorff, 1894)
 Sarika lopa Pholyotha, Sutcharit, Tongkerd, Lin & Panha, 2020
 Sarika megalogyne Pholyotha & Panha, 2020
 Sarika melanospira Pholyotha & Panha, 2020
 Sarika nana Pholyotha & Panha, 2020
 Sarika obesior (Martens, 1867)
 Sarika ochtogyra (Möllendorff, 1902)
 Sarika pellosa Pholyotha & Panha, 2020
 Sarika planata Laidlaw, 1933
 Sarika pumicata (Morelet, 1875)
 Sarika resplendens (Philippi, 1847)
 Sarika rex (Preston, 1909)
 Sarika siamensis (L. Pfeiffer, 1856)
 Sarika solemi Pholyotha & Panha, 2020
 Sarika subcornea (L. Pfeiffer, 1860)
 Sarika subheptagyra Pholyotha & Panha, 2020
 Sarika theodori (Philippi, 1847)

Synonyms
 Sarika asamurai (Panha, 1997): synonym of Taphrenalla asamurai (Panha, 1997) (superseded combination)
 Sarika diadema (Dall, 1897): synonym of Taphrenalla diadema (Dall, 1897) (superseded combination)
 Sarika hainesii (L. Pfeiffer, 1856): synonym of Sarika hainesi (L. Pfeiffer, 1856) (incorrect subsequent spelling)

References

 Bank, R. A. (2017). Classification of the Recent terrestrial Gastropoda of the World. Last update: July 16th, 2017

External links
 https://www.biodiversitylibrary.org/page/13069144 Godwin-Austen, H. H. (1882-1920). Land and freshwater Mollusca of India, including South Arabia, Baluchistan, Afghanistan, Kashmir, Nepal, Burmah, Pegu, Tenasserim, Malay Peninsula, Ceylon, and other islands of the Indian Ocean. Supplementary to Messrs. Theobald and Hanley's Conchologia Indica. London, Taylor & Francis.]
 Pholyotha, A., Sutcharit, C., Tongkerd, P. & Panha, S. (2020). Integrative taxonomic revision of the land snail genus Sarika Godwin-Austen, 1907 in Thailand, with descriptions of nine new species (Eupulmonata, Ariophantidae). ZooKeys. 976: 1–100

Ariophantidae